Quilty Nunataks is a group of nunataks (exposed ice-free ridges) which extend over 8 miles (13 km), located 15 miles (24 km) southwest of the Thomas Mountains in Palmer Land. Discovered by the Ronne Antarctic Research Expedition (RARE), 1947–48, led by Ronne, they were named by Advisory Committee on Antarctic Names (US-ACAN) for Patrick Quilty, geologist with the University of Wisconsin–Madison survey party to this area, 1965–66.

Nunataks of Palmer Land